Josselyn's Wife may refer to:
 Josselyn's Wife (1919 film), an American silent drama film
 Josselyn's Wife (1926 film), a silent crime drama